The Kostanayev House is a building in the  of Rostov-on-Don, Russia. The house is located at 37  at the intersection of Bolshaya Sadovaya Street and Semashko Lane. The building was designed in the Beaux-Arts style, and has the status of an object of cultural heritage of regional significance.

History
The Kostanayev House was built in the last quarter of the 19th century. The facades are rusticated, and the rectangular windows are surmounted with ornamental reliefs. A cornice crowns the top of the building. The Kostanayev House was built as a revenue house, and as such, shops occupied the ground floor while dwellings were on the upper floors.

Before the revolution of 1917, the house was owned by members of the Kostanayev family: Sergey, Matvey, Kirill, Grigory and Emmanuil. The ground floor of the building was rented by various trading establishments: the A. S. Gavrilov haberdashery shop, the Brothers V. and N. Blandov grocery shop, and the Dm. Smirnov jewelry shop. Between 1914 and 1917, the building housed the G. V. and K. Berezhnov trading house. 

In the 1920s, the ground floor of the building was occupied by the Alzan trading partnership shop, being succeeded by shop No. 8 of Gorkooptorg, as well as a record and gramophone shop. 1959 records show that by this time the ground floor housed Gorkooptorg's shop No. 8, as well as Gorpromtorg's toy shop No. 69, a watch repair shop, and a jewelry and engraving workshop. In the 1990s, there was a shop named Buratino, and a currency exchange office.

By decree No. 411 of the Head of the Rostov Oblast Administration on 9 October 1998, the house was designated a an object of cultural heritage of regional significance.

References 

Buildings and structures in Rostov-on-Don
Tourist attractions in Rostov-on-Don
Cultural heritage monuments in Rostov-on-Don
Beaux-Arts architecture in Russia
Commercial buildings completed in the 19th century
Residential buildings completed in the 19th century
Cultural heritage monuments of regional significance in Rostov Oblast